Isaac Jack Martin (July 18, 1908 – November 5, 1966) was an associate judge of the United States Court of Customs and Patent Appeals.

Education 

Born on July 18, 1908, in Cincinnati, Ohio, Martin received a Bachelor of Laws in 1932 from the University of Cincinnati College of Law, graduating Order of the Coif.

Career 
He entered private practice in Cincinnati from 1932 to 1940. He was an assistant prosecutor for Hamilton County, Ohio from 1933 to 1940. He was in private practice in Philadelphia, Pennsylvania from 1941 to 1944. He was an administrative assistant to United States Senator Robert A. Taft of Ohio from 1944 to 1953. He was an administrative assistant to President Dwight D. Eisenhower from 1953 to 1958.

Federal judicial service

Martin was nominated by President Dwight D. Eisenhower on July 18, 1958, to a seat on the United States Court of Customs and Patent Appeals vacated by Judge William Purington Cole Jr. He was confirmed by the United States Senate on August 5, 1958, and received his commission on August 6, 1958. Martin was initially appointed as a Judge under Article I, but the court was raised to Article III status by operation of law on August 25, 1958, and Martin thereafter served as an Article III Judge. His service terminated on November 5, 1966, due to his death.

Death

Martin died November 5, 1966, in Washington, D.C. Martin was Jewish and is interred at the United Jewish Cemetery in Evanston, Ohio.

References

External links
 

1908 births
1966 deaths
20th-century American lawyers
Judges of the United States Court of Customs and Patent Appeals
Ohio lawyers
United States Article I federal judges appointed by Dwight D. Eisenhower
20th-century American judges
University of Cincinnati College of Law alumni